Coleolaelaps is a genus of mites in the family Laelapidae.

Species
 Coleolaelaps agrestis (Berlese, 1887)
 Coleolaelaps asiaticus Karg, 1999
 Coleolaelaps costai Joharchi & Halliday, 2011
 Coleolaelaps inopinatus Grandi, 1925
 Coleolaelaps tongyuensis Ma, 1997
 Coleolaelaps variosetatus Karg, 1999

References

Laelapidae